Franja de Gaza is an Argentine band formed in 2003 that has arguably achieved wide success in the local underground scene since the release of Abyss Falling, its first album.

History 
The band's first formation dedicated its first few months of 2003 to rehearse and present a show performing Guns N' Roses covers, taking advantage of Javier Griner’s voice and Marcos Farhat’ Les Paul skills. The first three original songs performed by Franja de Gaza were "Day", "Shadow" and "Dark Bridges". The band immediately achieved mild success giving several interviews and unplugged shows in different radios, most importantly Mario Pergolini's Rock & Pop.

After Griner emigrated to Canada, the band entered into a one year hiatus looking for a good replacement for the vocalist. After several failed trials the band came upon Facundo Arias, Marcos’ life-long friend, to help with the vocals. Matías Guerisoli also replaced Alejandro Filippini as the drummer. This second formation faced several problems due to Arias' heavy addiction to heroin. During this period only the hit "Loosing  My Only Star" made it to the debut album.

During 2005, unable to cope with Arias' addiction, rhythmic guitarist Esteban Aguilera decided to leave the band. Moreover, Arias entered rehabilitation and the three members left (Tajman, Farhat and Guerisoli) took the vocals job to themselves.

Halfway through 2006, musical prodigy Martín Toblli joined as a drummer (thus the fourth band formation), and together Franja de Gaza finalized the arrangements for the songs written for the first album. The songs were recorded by Julián Barrett, guitarist of the successful local power metal band Lörihen between 2006 and 2007. Barrett also produced the album.

Over the next six months, the band worked on a year-old idea, a jam session that would result in the song "Black River". What at first looked like a simple and short song culminated in a song that passed the 11-minute marker, evolving into a series of rhythmic variations. After recording this last song, Martín quit the band. The members told the press that "creative differences" had been the reason for his departure, however it was later admitted that Toblli had received a better offer by local punk stars Matterhorn.

Through the last few months of the year 2007, the band recorded "What Came Along", a song that required only guitar, voice and cello (executed by Mariana Levitín). At the start of 2008 Franja de Gaza recorded "Loosing  My Only Star" with the help of Martín Toblli in drums and Alejandro Corres in vocals, who is still working alongside the band. With the exception of "Jump" and "Walking", all other songs were recorded in Mataco Studios by Marcelo Valerga.

Having the 8 songs that would make up the first record, Franja masterized with Grammy Award winner Andrés Mayo. The result was Abyss Falling, widely acclaimed by critics and the local audience. Franja is actually touring Latin America and will be playing also in Spain in the upcoming season.

After the album's success Toblli left Matterhorn, who was struggling with government censorship, and re-joined Franja.

External links 
 Official Website
 Marcos Farhat Free Guitar Video Lessons
 Andres Mayo Official Website

Argentine hard rock musical groups